The North African Futsal Tournament was a national futsal (indoor association football) competition of the North Africa nations, however some other teams which are not members were invited.

Winners

Summary

Most successful national teams 

* hosts.

See also 
 UNAF Tournament
 UNAF U-23 Tournament
 UNAF U-20 Tournament
 UNAF U-18 Tournament
 UNAF U-17 Tournament
 UNAF U-15 Tournament
 UNAF Women's Tournament
 UNAF U-21 Women's Tournament
 UNAF U-20 Women's Tournament

References

 
International futsal competitions
UNAF competitions
Futsal competitions in Africa